The Zimmerbergbus is a bus network in the Horgen District in Switzerland, operated by the Sihltal Zürich Uetliberg Bahn (SZU) and its local partner firms: AHW Busbetriebe AG in Horgen, Busbetriebe Bamert GmbH in Wollerau, Leuthold Transfer AG in Horgen, and PostAuto Schweiz AG Region Zürich. The network is named after the Zimmerberg.

Network 
The Sihltal Zürich Uetliberg Bahn AG provides within Zürcher Verkehrsverbund (ZVV) a network of  including 201 stops. The network connects the Zimmerberg region and parts of the Sihl Valley which includes the municipalities Adliswil, Hirzel, Horgen, Hütten, Langnau am Albis, Oberrieden, Richterswil-Samstagern, Schönenberg, Thalwil and Wädenswil. Bus connections within the municipalities Kilchberg and Rüschlikon are provided by the Verkehrsbetriebe Zürich (VBZ).

Fleet 
As of January 2014 the fleet consisted of 40+ vehicles

Notes

External links 
  
 Zimmerbergbus 

Bus companies of Switzerland
Public transport in Switzerland
Transport companies of Switzerland
Transport in the canton of Zürich